Jeffrey Whitefoot (born 18 April 1956 in Bedwas, Wales) is a former Wales international rugby union player. Whitefoot played his club rugby for Bedwas and Cardiff and attained 19 international caps. He also made an appearance for the British & Irish Lions against a Rest of the World XV in 1986 and Finally received his Lions cap 32 years later. The presentation took place at Mr Whitefoot's home in Energlyn, Caerphilly after family and friends organised a surprise party – they had to hide the cap for several weeks when it arrived in the post. Jeff also played for a Five Nations XV versus the Overseas Unions in the same year.

References

1956 births
Living people
Bedwas RFC players
British & Irish Lions rugby union players from Wales
Cardiff RFC players
Rugby union players from Bedwas
Wales international rugby union players
Welsh rugby union players